The 1919–20 season was the 20th season of competitive football in Belgium.

Overview
FC Brugeois won the Division I for the first time. For that season, no relegation or promotion occurred.

National team

* Belgium score given first

Key
 H = Home match
 A = Away match
 N = On neutral ground
 F = Friendly
 o.g. = own goal

Honours

Final league tables

Division I

Promotion

External links
RSSSF archive - Final tables 1895-2002
Belgian clubs history